Anaphe vuilleti is a moth of the family Notodontidae. It was described by Joseph de Joannis in 1907. It is found in the Democratic Republic of the Congo and Senegal.

References

 

Notodontidae
Moths described in 1907
Moths of Africa